Craig McCreeth is a Goalkeeping Coach from London. Craig holds the UEFA B Licence and FAW Goalkeeping B Licence and is currently the Reading FC Women Goalkeeping Coach.

Craig has previously held roles at Barnet F.C.as an academy goalkeeping coach and as First Team goalkeeping coach, taking over when Marlon Beresford left the London club to join Motherwell F.C. This appointment meant that Craig became the youngest English Football League coach. Craig was also the Academy goalkeeping coach at Watford FC before joining Reading FC Women.

Coaching roles

References

Year of birth missing (living people)
Living people
Football people in England